Alexandra Richter (born 5 June 1967) is a Brazilian actress.

Selected filmography
 Chico Total (1996)
 Mandacaru  (1997)
 Por Amor (1997)
 Laços de Família (2000)
 Coração de Estudante (2002)
 A Diarista (2005)
 Zorra Total (2005-2009)
 Passione (telenovela) (2010)
 Os Caras de Pau (2011)
 Cheias de Charme (2012)
 Malhação (2013)
 Boogie Oogie (2014)
 A Regra do Jogo (2015)

Awards and nominations

References

External links

1967 births
Living people
Actresses from Rio de Janeiro (city)
Brazilian television actresses
Brazilian telenovela actresses
Brazilian film actresses